Lamoille Lake is a glacial tarn in the Ruby Mountains of Elko County, Nevada, United States. It is within the Ruby Mountains Ranger District of the Humboldt-Toiyabe National Forest. It is a popular destination for day hikers and fishing, as the Ruby Crest National Recreation Trail passes its eastern shore before beginning a steep climb to Liberty Pass.

Lamoille Lake and the Dollar Lakes are the principal sources of Lamoille Creek, which after exiting the mountains passes through the town of Lamoille, meanders down Lamoille Valley, and then merges with the main branch of the Humboldt River.

References

Ruby Mountains
Lakes of Nevada
Lakes of Elko County, Nevada
Lakes of the Great Basin
Humboldt–Toiyabe National Forest